Wolfgang Degenhardt (19 May 1924 – 8 November 1993) was an artist, prominent in Newcastle located in the Hunter Region of New South Wales, Australia. Husband of Irene Degenhardt (17 August 1921 - 22 March 2016).

Degenhardt was born in Germany, studied art in Bremen and Milan.  He migrated to Greta, New South Wales in the Hunter Valley in January 1955, with his wife Irene and son Fred and stepson Alex after the second world war. Shortly after arriving in Australia. He worked at BHP steel works, in the coke ovens as part of the immigration program at the time, which required people to work for two years in an industry chosen by the Australian Government.  A year after arriving in Australia, he built his own home on Warners Bay Road, Charlestown. It was hard work, as the acre block he selected, was dense Australian bush land. To clear the block he used hand saws and an axe. He built the home with a small loan from the Commonwealth Bank, coming home after his shift at BHP to cut timbers and paint. The house has remained relatively unchanged to this day.

Over the years he presented one of his paintings to every man who retired from the Newcastle Steel Works coke ovens department using art supplies given to him by BHP, he became very well known for this. He worked for the BHP for 35 years before retiring.

Degenhardt won the inaugural Newcastle Art Prize and was a regional winner of Maitland Art Prize.  He presented a one-man exhibitions at Barry Stern Galleries 1968, Sydney and Lights Gallery, Newcastle 1963.  He was a frequent contributor to the Blake Prize for Religious Art.  He is represented in many private collections throughout the world.

Degenhardt was featured within newspapers, journals and on NBN and ABC television as his artwork became prominent. He painted in many different styles including impressionism, expressionism, landscapes & portraits.

There are two drawings in the Newcastle Region Art Gallery's collection.

The Forgotten I. 1963
triptych
pen, black ink wash and red pastel on paper
sight measurements - left to right 38.1 x 17.8 cm, 41.5 x 11.1 cm, 38.1 x 17.8 cm
inscribed on left and centre sheet lower right and lower left on right sheet in ink "Degenhardt/63"
executed in the autumn of 1963 at Charlestown, New South Wales
Purchased from "Wolfgang Degenhardt" exhibition catalogue number 26 on 21 June 1963 by Gil Docking at Lights Gallery, Newcastle, New South Wales
accession number 1963.021
Gallery's Comment - Black pen and ink drawing with red pastel on wet paper. Figure expression composition, executed in triptych form.

Victim III. 1972
pen, ink wash and red conte crayon on paper
sheet size 53.0 x 72.3 cm
inscribed lower left in ink "Degenhardt/72"
executed in May 1972 at the artist's house Charlestown, NSW
Purchased from the exhibition "Hunter Valley Artists" catalogue number 28, at Newcastle City Art Gallery 1 September to 1 October 1972
accession number 1972.056
Gallery's Comment - One of a group of three drawings, "Victim I - III", shown in the exhibition and completed early 1972. They have a general relationship to such contemporary events as the Vietnam War and the Bangladesh tragedy, but do not relate to any one event in particular. They present a general view of man's inhumanity to man in the world of today. But it is not just a view of sorrow. There is some beauty too. Beauty in the lives of the human figures and particularly in the hands and their expressive qualities. Forms and features are over emphasised to heighten expression and feeling. Colours are restricted to black and white to give a stronger effect, with red conte added as a softener and enlivening touch. (verbal information from the artist 19 September 1972)

Irene, born in Cologne, Germany. A writer for the Mavis Branson show, met Wolfgang whilst travelling in the war years. She was responsible for organising his gallery appearances and named many of his works.

German emigrants to Australia
Expressionist painters
1924 births
1993 deaths
20th-century Australian painters
20th-century Australian male artists
Australian male painters